Hillwood is the debut solo studio album by hip hop recording artist South Park Mexican. It was released via Dope House Records in early 1995.

The album's title "Hillwood" comes from the unincorporated neighborhood of the Southside region of Houston. He sold the album from the trunk of his car, flea markets and at car shows for $5 each.

Track listing

Personnel
Carlos Coy – main artist, producer (track 11)
Delwin "Mad Reel" Bell – keyboards, producer (tracks: 1-4, 6-9)
Bernie Bismark – producer (tracks: 5, 10)
Steven "Dope E" Baggett – drum programming (track 11)
Shetoro Henderson – mixing, mastering, engineering
Arthur Coy Jr. – executive producer
Jimmy Stephens – art direction
Romero – photography

References

External links

1995 debut albums
South Park Mexican albums